Live in New York is a 1981 live double album by James Brown. It was recorded in 1980 at the Studio 54 nightclub. It includes two studio instrumentals, "Brown's Inferno" and "Bay Ridge Boogy", performed by the Bay Ridge Band.

In 1982 a single-LP abbreviation of Live in New Yorks contents was released under the title Mean on the Scene (Audio Fidelity/Phoenix). Since then the contents of the original double LP have been reissued repeatedly, usually with the studio instrumentals (and sometimes other tracks) omitted, under titles including At Studio 54 (1994, Charly) and Live in New York 1980''' (2009, Cleopatra).

A film recording of Brown's Studio 54 performance has received various releases, notably the 2008 DVD Double Dynamite'' (Charly).

Track listing

References

James Brown live albums
1981 live albums
Studio 54